The Atholl Arms Hotel is a hotel and restaurant in Blair Atholl, Perth and Kinross, Scotland. Standing on the B8079, it is a Category C listed building dating to 1832.

Gallery

See also
 List of listed buildings in Blair Atholl, Perth and Kinross

References

External links

Hotels in Perth and Kinross
Listed buildings in Blair Atholl
Hotel buildings completed in 1832
Listed hotels in Scotland
Railway hotels in Scotland
Category C listed buildings in Perth and Kinross
1832 establishments in Scotland